The 2021 Maia Challenger was a professional tennis tournament played on clay courts. It was the third edition of the tournament which was part of the 2021 ATP Challenger Tour. It took place in Maia, Portugal from 6 to 12 December 2021.

Singles main-draw entrants

Seeds

 1 Rankings are as of 29 November 2021.

Other entrants
The following players received wildcards into the singles main draw:
  Pedro Araújo
  Tiago Cação
  Duarte Vale

The following players received entry into the singles main draw using protected rankings:
  Elliot Benchetrit
  Julien Cagnina

The following players received entry from the qualifying draw:
  Lorenzo Bocchi
  Miguel Damas
  Oscar Moraing
  Simone Roncalli

Champions

Singles

  Geoffrey Blancaneaux def.  Tseng Chun-hsin 3–6, 6–3, 6–2.

Doubles

  Nuno Borges /  Francisco Cabral def.  Andrej Martin /  Gonçalo Oliveira 6–3, 6–4.

References

2021 ATP Challenger Tour
2021 in Portuguese tennis
December 2021 sports events in Portugal